News Breakfast is an Australian news breakfast television program. It is broadcast on ABC TV and ABC News channel from 6:00 am to 9:00 am AEST/AEDT on weekdays and is hosted by Michael Rowland and Lisa Millar. The program is also streamed live on ABC iView and the Australia Network throughout the Asia-Pacific region.

History
The program commenced broadcasting on 3 November 2008 as ABC News Breakfast on ABC2 (now ABC TV Plus), with hosts Virginia Trioli, Barrie Cassidy (Monday-Thursday) and Joe O'Brien (Friday), sport presenter Paul Kennedy and weather presenter Vanessa O'Hanlon.

News Breakfast is currently hosted by Michael Rowland and Lisa Millar and is broadcast on ABC TV and ABC News. They are joined by sport presenter Tony Armstrong, finance presenter Madeleine Morris and weather presenter Nate Byrne. Tyson Shine is the program's executive producer.

In January 2009, O'Brien replaced Cassidy as a full-time co-host with Cassidy continuing to appear on the program providing political commentary.

In June 2010, Michael Rowland replaced O'Brien, who moved back to Sydney to present ABC News Mornings on ABC News 24. (now ABC News)

In May 2011, the program moved to ABC, with children's programming moving to ABC2 (now ABC TV Plus) and ABC3 (now ABC Me)

In November 2011, it was announced that the ABC News Breakfast brand would expand to the weekend with Weekend Breakfast hosted by Andrew Geoghegan and Miriam Corowa.

In January 2014, ABC News Breakfast had an extensive makeover, launching a larger new and improved set with three different individual presenting areas. The set includes a news desk, a newswall presenting area and a soft set with seating. The new set kept the existing couch that has been seen on air since the show's launch.

In April 2017, following the refresh of the ABC News brand, the show rebranded to News Breakfast.

In May 2019, Trioli announced she will leave News Breakfast to replace Jon Faine as the Mornings presenter on ABC Radio Melbourne.

In June 2019, ABC announced that Lisa Millar would succeed Virginia Trioli, commencing on 19 August. Trioli finished on the show on 16 August.

Format
News Breakfast covers the latest news, analysis, debate, finance, sport and weather. It draws upon the resources of ABC newsrooms and radio programs across Australia and the world.

The program is broadcast live on ABC in the states of New South Wales, Australian Capital Territory, Victoria and Tasmania all-year round. It is broadcast on a 30-minute delay in South Australia (all-year) and the Northern Territory (wintertime). On wintertime, Queensland broadcasts the program live, while Western Australia airs the program on a two-hour delay.

During summer, when only some Australian states adopt daylight saving time, Queensland receives the program on a one-hour delay, a 90-minute delay in the Northern Territory and on a three-hour delay in Western Australia. Either way, the ABC News channel broadcasts the program live across Australia from 6:00 am AEST/AEDT.

Weekend Breakfast
Weekend Breakfast is a mix of live breaking news and discussion, interviews with newsmakers and the weekend sport and weather hosted by Johanna Nicholson and Fauziah Ibrahim. The show began on 4 February 2012 and airs from 7:00 am to 11:00 am on weekend mornings on the ABC News channel. It is simulcast on the ABC TV on Sunday mornings from 7:00 am to 9:00 am.

The Breakfast Couch 
The Breakfast Couch is a highlights show which covers the best arts and entertainment chats from the previous week on News Breakfast. The show began on 12 August 2017.

Presenters and reporters

News Breakfast

Weekend Breakfast

Fill-in presenters 
Current presenters who have been fill-in hosts or co-hosts of News Breakfast in recent times include Madeleine Morris, Mary Gearin, James Glenday, David Speers, Ali Moore, Bridget Brennan, Stephanie Ferrier, Catherine Murphy, Nour Haydar, Iskhandar Razak, Fauziah Ibrahim and Emma Rebellato.

Fill-in presenters for other roles:

 Sport: Catherine Murphy, Emma Rebellato, Tom Maddocks and Lucy Carter
 Weather: Annie Kearney, Danny Tran, Stephanie Ferrier, Emma Rebellato and Kirsten Diprose

Other presenters who have either filled in presenting News Breakfast in the past include Jeremy Fernandez, Kumi Taguchi, Del Irani, Paul Kennedy, Emma Alberici, Hamish Macdonald, Zoe Daniel, John Barron, Georgie Tunny, Greg Jennett, Sara James, Beverley O'Connor, Tracee Hutchison, Frances Bell, Karina Carvalho, Melissa Clarke and Tamara Oudyn.

Former presenters

News Breakfast

Weekend Breakfast

Regulars
The program features a number of regular segments and guests which appear each morning discussing the latest news and politics.  
 Alice Zaslavsky – Food
Barrie Cassidy – Politics
Katherine Tulich – Entertainment
 Zan Rowe – "The Beat"
 Zak Hepburn – Films

References

External links
 
 "Meet the new team for Breakfast", TVTonight.com.au

Australian television news shows
Australian Broadcasting Corporation original programming
2008 Australian television series debuts
2010s Australian television series
English-language television shows
Breakfast television in Australia
Television shows set in Melbourne